Steiner was a small farming settlement in what is now Frenchtown Charter Township, Monroe County in the U.S. state of Michigan. The village no longer exists but some structures remain and are in use.

The village of Steiner was located about five miles north of Monroe Michigan, and was centered around the Steiner Depot of the Pere Marquette Railroad.

Steiner was founded by and named for William Steiner in 1873.  A post office opened on September 7, 1886 with John Kohler as the first postmaster. The office closed on July 31, 1925.

At one time the town had a railroad depot, creamery, granary, freight scales, a saw-mill, basket factory, pottery and brick works, a saloon (the Steiner Inn), the Laduke general store and the Steiner Post Office.

For some years the railroad maintained a spur extending west from a siding in Steiner to a sand quarry near Maybee, Michigan.

The general store and other structures, located between Laduke Roads and the railroad tracks were destroyed in a fire on May 3 of 1948. An elderly woman, Mrs. Margaret Gibson, age 70 and Magadline Moyer, age 5 perished in the fire.  There was a significant delay in the arrival of rescuers, as the closest fire department was located five miles south, in Monroe.

Few obvious signs remain today of this town except a cluster of several pre-1900 houses, the basket factory building near the railroad tracks, and the road name.

Steiner is now one of the lost cities, towns, and counties of Michigan

Gallery

References 

Unincorporated communities in Michigan
Unincorporated communities in Monroe County, Michigan
Former villages in Michigan
Populated places established in 1873
1873 establishments in Michigan